Eduardo López is an Argentine film editor and documentary film director.

Some of the films he has edited have been critically well received: Funny Dirty Little War.

Selected filmography
 Tiempo de Revancha (1981)
 The Deal (1983)
 No habrá más penas ni olvido (1983) aka Funny Dirty Little War
 Cocaine Wars (1985) La Muerte blanca
 The Year of The Rabbit (1987)
 Peculiar Attraction (1988)
 A Place in the World (1992)
 Adiós, abuelo (1996)
 Harto The Borges

References

External links
 

Argentine film editors
Living people
Year of birth missing (living people)
Place of birth missing (living people)